Children's interest channels are television specialty channels that present children's interest content.

List

Worldwide
 BabyTV
 BabyFirstTV
 Boomerang
 Central and Eastern Europe 
 Middle East 
 UK
 Cartoon Network
 Cartoon Network Arabic (Middle East)
 Central and Eastern Europe
 Cartoon Network Hindi (Middle East)
 Middle East and Africa
 Cartoonito
 Middle East block
 Cartoonito (Italy)
 Cartoonito (UK)
 American programming block (United States)
 CBeebies (Worldwide)
 Disney Channel
 Disney Junior
 Disney XD
 Duck TV
 JimJam (EMEA, Latin America & Asia-Pacific)
 Nickelodeon
 Nick 2 (Latin America)
 Nickelodeon Sonic (India)
 Middle East and North Africa
 Central and Eastern Europe
 Nicktoons (worldwide)
 European 
 Nick Jr. (worldwide)
 Middle East and North Africa
 Nick Jr. Too (UK)
 Nick Music
 TeenNick
 ZooMoo (UK, Asia)

Americas
 BBC Kids (Canada)
 Canal 5 (Mexico)
 Discovery Family (US)
 Discovery Kids (Latin America)
 Family (Canada)
 Family CHRGD (Canada)
 Family Jr. (Canada)
 Gloob (Brazil)
 Kids Street (US)
 Nat Geo Kids (Latin America And Brazil)
 NTV (Chile)
 Once Niños (Mexico)
 PakaPaka (Argentina)
 PBS Kids (US)
 Primo TV (US)
 Semillitas (US)
 Smile (US)
 Teletoon & Télétoon (Canada)
 Treehouse TV (Canada)
 Universal Kids (US)
 Vme Kids (US)
 Vrak (Canada)
 Yoopa (Canada)
 YTV (Canada)

Asia
 ARB Günəş (Azerbaijan)
 Animax (Japan, Southeast Asia, India)
 Aniworld (China)
 Astro Ceria (Malaysia)
 Astro Xiao Tai Yang (Malaysia)
Balapan (Kazakhstan)
 Channel 5 (Singapore, Okto only)
 Channel 8 (Singapore, Okto only)
 CCTV-14 (China)
 Chutti TV (South India)
 DreamWorks Channel (Southeast Asia)
 Dunia Anak (Indonesia)
 Duronto TV (Bangladesh)
 EBS Kids (South Korea)
 Hungama TV (India)
 Kaku (China)
 K+ KIDS (Vietnam)
 KBS Kids (South Korea)
 Kids Station (Japan)
 Kids TV (Indonesia)
 Kids Zone (Pakistan)
 KiZmom (South Korea)
 Mentari TV (Indonesia)
 NHK E (Japan)
 ON Bibi (Vietnam)
 ON Kids (Vietnam)
 RTV (Indonesia, majority of programming)
 SCTV3 (Vietnam)
 Shanghai Toonmax (China)
 Sony YAY! (India)
 Tooniverse (South Korea)
 TV3 (Malaysia, Bananana! only)
 TV9 (Malaysia, Jaguh Kartun only)
 VTV7 (Vietnam)
 Yey! (Philippines)

Europe
 Bang Bang (Albania)
 Biggs (Portugal)
 Boing (France, Italy, Spain)
 C More Juniori (Finland)
 Canal+ Kids (France)
 Canal J (France)
 Canal Panda (Iberia)
 Canal Super3 (Catalonia, Spain)
 Canvas (Belgium, Ketnet Jr. only)
 Carousel (Russia)
 CBBC Channel (UK)
 Channel 5 (UK, Milkshake! and Shake! only)
 CITV (UK)
 Clan (Spain)
 Club RTL (Belgium, Kidz RTL Only)
 Cúla 4 (Ireland)
 ČT :D (Czech Republic)
 Çufo (Albania)
 DeA Kids (Italy)
 DR Ramasjang (Denmark)
 DR Ultra (Denmark)
 Duck TV (Slovakia)
 ETB 3 (Basque Country, Spain)
 Fix & Foxi (Germany, Middle East)
 France 4 (France, Okoo only)
 Frisbee (Italy)
 Gulli (France, Middle East, Russia, Brazil, Africa)
 Hiro (Italy)
 Italia Teen Television (Italy)
 ITVBe (UK, LittleBe Only)
 Jojko (Slovakia)
 Junior (Germany)
 K2 (Italy)
 Ketnet (Belgium)
 KidZone TV (Baltics)
 KidZone Mini (Baltics)
 KiKa (Germany)
 La Trois (Belgium, OufTivi only)
 M2 (Hungary)
 M6 (France, M6 Kid only)
 Minimax (Central and Eastern Europe)
 MiniMini+ (Poland)
 Neox Kidz (Spain)
 NRK Super (Norway)
 NPO 3 (Netherlands, NPO Zapp and NPO Zappelin only)
 ORF 1 (Austria, Okidoki only)
 Piwi+ (France)
 Pixel TV (Ukraine)
 PLUSPLUS (Ukraine)
 Pop (UK)
 Pop Max (UK)
 Pikaboo (Balkans, USA)
 Puls 2 (Poland, Puls Kids and Junior TV only.)
 Rai Yoyo (Italy)
 Rai Gulp (Italy)
 RTÉjr (Ireland)
 RTL Kockica (Croatia)
 RTP2 (Portugal, Zig Zag only)
 RTL Telekids (Netherlands)
 RTS 1 (Switzerland, RTS Kids only)
 RTS 2 (Switzerland, RTS Kids only)
 RTSH Fëmijë (Albania)
 RTSH Shkollë (Albania)
 Semejka (Baltics)
 SIC K (Portugual)
 Sky Kids (UK)
 Smile TV (Greece)
 Star Channel (Greece, Starland only)
 Super RTL (Germany, Toggo and Toggolino only)
 SVT Barn (Sweden)
 SRF 1 (Switzerland, Zambo only)
 SRF zwei (Switzerland, Zambo only)
 Télétoon+ (France, Poland)
 TF1 (France, TFOU only)
 TiJi (France, Russia, Portugal)
 Tiny Pop (UK)
 TiVi5 Monde (France)
 Top Kids (Poland)
 Tring Tring (Albania)
 TV2 Kids (Hungary)
 TV3 Mini (Latvia)
 TVP ABC (Poland)
 Vavoom (Balkans)
 VTM (Belgium, VTM Kids only)
 YLE Teema & Fem (Finland, Pikku Kakkonen only)
 YLE TV2 (Finland, Pikku Kakkonen and Galaxi only)

Middle East
 Ajyal TV/TV5 Saudi Ajyal (Saudi Arabia, 2009 to 2018)
 Almajd Kids TV (Saudi Arabia)
 ART Teenz (Middle East)
 Atfal & Mawaheb (Saudi Arabia)
 Arutz HaYeladim (Israel)
 Baby Channel (Arabic)
 Baraem (Qatar)
 Basma (Saudi Arabia)
 Batoot Kids (Arabic)
 beJunior (Qatar)
 Canary TV (Saudi Arabia)
 Dar Al Qamar (Syria)
 Djurdjura TV (Algeria)
 DKids (Middle East)
 e-Junior (United Arab Emirates)
 Fun Channel (Middle East)
 Hadi TV (Lebanon)
 HodHod TV (Iran)
 Hop! Channel (Israel)
 Jeem TV (Qatar)
 Kan Educational (Israel)
 Karameesh (Jordan)
 Koky Kids (Arabic)
 Koogi TV (Arabic)
 Kurdmax Pepûle (Iraqi Kurdistan)
 Kuwait Kids (Kuwait)
 Libya Kids (Libya)
 Libya Marah (Libya)
 Majid Kids TV (United Arab Emirates)
 MBC 3 (Saudi Arabia)
 Mickey Channel (Arabic)
 Mody Kids (Arabic)
 Nat Geo Kids Abu Dhabi (United Arab Emirates)
 Nejma Kids (Morocco)
 Noon TV (Jordan)
 Nour Kids (Lebanon)
 OSN Kid Zone TV (Middle East)
 Radio Dal (Saudi Arabia)
 Rawda (Saudi Arabia)
 Rotana Kids (Saudi Arabia)
 Sana TV (Saudi Arabia)
 Sanabel TV (Sudan)
 SAT-7 Kids (Cyprus)
 Semsem (Saudi Arabia)
 Shehab TV (Arabic)
 Sindbad TV (Iraq)
 Sokar TV (Arabic)
 Spacetoon (Arab World, Indonesia and Ukraine)
 Tagareed (Saudi Arabia)
 Taha TV (Lebanon)
 Tayba Ashbal TV (Sudan)
 TekTok Cartoon (Arabic)
 Toyor Al Janah (Jordan)
 Toyor Baby (Jordan)
 Çocuk Smart (Turkey) 
 TRT Çocuk (Turkey)
 Zarok TV (Turkey, Kurdistan)
 Zaro tv (Kurdistan)
 Zoom (Israel)

Oceania
 ABC Kids (Australia)
 ABC ME (Australia)
 BBC Kids (Australia)
 TVNZ Kidzone (New Zealand)
 FOUR (New Zealand TV Channel) (majority of programming)

Television channels and networks by content